Santiago Raúl Lange (born September 22, 1961 in San Isidro, Argentina) is an Argentine Olympic sailor and a naval architect.

Sailing career
He studied Naval Architecture at Southampton Collage of Higher Education (now known as Solent University) he did a degree in yacht design. He went on to work for Argentina designer German Frers for a couple of years before concentrating on competitive sailing.

Olympics

Representing Argentina over 32 years period he competed seven times in the Summer Olympics winning a gold and two bronze medals.
 

He qualified to represent Argentina at the 2020 Summer Olympics. He was one of Argentina's flag bearers for the opening ceremony at the 2020 Olympic Games.

World Championships

He is a 4 time World Champion, with 3 Snipe World Championships (1985, 1993 and 1995) and 1 Tornado World Championship (2004), twice runner-up in 1987 (Snipe) and 2006 (Tornado), and 3 times third place in 1979 (Cadet), 2003 (Tornado) and 2018 (Nacra 17).

Offshore Sailing

He has twice sailed the Volvo Ocean Race; in 2001–02 on Team SEB and in 2008–09 on Telefónica Black.

America Cup
He sailed for Victory Challenge in the 2007 Louis Vuitton Cup.

For the 34th America's Cup was a member of Artemis Racing the Swedish Challenger.

Other Events
He also won the silver medal at the 1987 Pan American Games (Snipe) and the 1995 Pan American Games (Laser).

In 1985 he won the Snipe South American Championship.

Awards
In 2016, he was named Sailor of the Year by World Sailing.

Personal life
Lange's sons Yago and Klaus are who are also Olympic sailors.

One of the most remarkable things is that in 2015 following repeatable illness he was diagnosed with cancer in this lung which required 25% removal of one of his lungs he battled back quickly to take gold despite lose of fitness and time on the water so close to the games in which he won gold.

References

External links
 official website
 

1961 births
Living people
Alumni of Solent University
Argentine people of German descent
Argentine male sailors (sport)
Artemis Racing sailors
Club Náutico San Isidro
Medalists at the 2004 Summer Olympics
Medalists at the 2008 Summer Olympics
Medalists at the 2016 Summer Olympics
Olympic bronze medalists for Argentina
Olympic gold medalists for Argentina
Olympic medalists in sailing
Olympic sailors of Argentina
Sailors at the 1988 Summer Olympics – Soling
Sailors at the 1996 Summer Olympics – Laser
Sailors at the 2000 Summer Olympics – Tornado
Sailors at the 2004 Summer Olympics – Tornado
Sailors at the 2008 Summer Olympics – Tornado
Sailors at the 2016 Summer Olympics – Nacra 17
Sailors at the 2020 Summer Olympics – Nacra 17
Pan American Games silver medalists for Argentina
Pan American Games bronze medalists for Argentina
Sportspeople from Buenos Aires
Tornado class world champions
Snipe class world champions
World champions in sailing for Argentina
ISAF World Sailor of the Year (male)
Pan American Games medalists in sailing
2013 America's Cup sailors
2007 America's Cup sailors
Volvo Ocean Race sailors
Extreme Sailing Series sailors
Sailors at the 1983 Pan American Games
Sailors at the 1987 Pan American Games
Sailors at the 1995 Pan American Games
Medalists at the 1987 Pan American Games
Medalists at the 1995 Pan American Games